Güləzi (also, Gyulezi and Gyulyazy) is a village and municipality in the Quba Rayon of Azerbaijan.  It has a population of 1,375.  The municipality consists of the villages of Güləzi, Aydınkənd, Dalaqo, Kunxırt, Xanagahyolu, and Xırt.

References

External links

Populated places in Quba District (Azerbaijan)